Lithuania competed at the 1994 World Aquatics Championships in Rome, Italy.

Medalists

Swimming

7 swimmers represented Lithuania:

Men

Women

References

Nations at the 1994 World Aquatics Championships
1994 in Lithuanian sport
Lithuania at the World Aquatics Championships